Markus Jamaine Curry (born April 7, 1981) is a former American football cornerback. He was originally signed by the San Diego Chargers as an undrafted free agent in 2005. He played college football at Michigan.

Professional career
He entered the NFL as an undrafted free agent in 2005 with the San Diego Chargers. He spent the majority of the season on the practice squad. He was activated for one game after Terrence Kiel was placed on injured reserve. He was signed by the  San Francisco 49ers in the 2007 offseason but was cut at the end of training camp. He was re-signed by the 49ers to their practice squad on November 27, 2007.

References

1981 births
Living people
Players of American football from Detroit
American football cornerbacks
Michigan Wolverines football players
San Diego Chargers players
San Francisco 49ers players
Valley Forge Military Academy Trojans football players